Nuneham Railway Bridge, known as the Black Bridge. is near the town of Abingdon in Oxfordshire, England. It carries the Cherwell Valley Line across the River Thames between Abingdon Lock and Sandford Lock on the line between Didcot and Oxford.

The original Nuneham Railway Bridge was constructed of timber in 1844 but was demolished during the 1850s after it was replaced by an iron bridge in 1856. The second bridge was replaced by the  present bridge in 1929. Its name is derived from the neighbouring Nuneham House.

History
Nuneham Railway Bridge was built in the early years of the Great Western Railway. The company built a branch line from its line running west out of London to serve Oxford which became known as the Cherwell Valley Line. A bridge to cross the River Thames required its design and alterations to be approved by the Thames Commissioners and were supervised by the civil engineer George Treacher.

The original bridge, which opened to traffic during 1844 proved inadequate and work on its replacement began a decade later. In 1856, the second bridge, distinguished from its predecessor by its iron structure, was completed. A third bridge was constructed in 1929; it has a single bow structure composed primarily of steel.

See also
 Crossings of the River Thames

References

External links
 Nuneham Railway Bridge via structurae.net
 Nuneham Railway Bridge, River Thames via geograph.org.uk

Bridges across the River Thames
Bridges completed in 1929
Railway bridges in Oxfordshire